Gledstone Hall is a 20th-century country house in West Marton, near Skipton, North Yorkshire, England.  Designed by Edwin Lutyens it stands in a 12 hectare (30 acre) estate. It is a Grade II* listed building. The gardens are separately listed Grade II.

History
Gledstone House

Gledstone House was a previous house (now demolished) which stood on the site and was built for Richard Roundell , probably by John Carr of York. Roundell died before it could be completed and was succeeded by his brother, the Revd William Roundell, a Deputy Lieutenant and J.P. His son, Richard Henry Roundell, inherited and was High Sheriff of Yorkshire for 1835–36. The estate descended in the Roundell family until Richard Roundell sold it, with 2300 ha (5600 acres) of estate, to Lancashire mill-owner Sir Amos Nelson in 1923.

Gledstone Hall

The existing building was designed for Sir Amos Nelson by Edwin Lutyens and built between 1925 and 1927. The previous house was demolished in 1928. The gardens were laid out c.1930 by Gertrude Jekyll. Sir Amos died in 1947 and his young wife in 1966.  It was converted into a nursing home for some time (but which failed in 1991) and was bought by Margaret Francis, the widow of artist Sam Francis. She has commissioned a total refurbishment of the building.

References

Country houses in North Yorkshire
Grade II* listed buildings in North Yorkshire
Grade II* listed houses
Works of Edwin Lutyens in England
Gardens in North Yorkshire
Gardens by Gertrude Jekyll